Four ships of the Royal Navy have been named HMS Birmingham, after the city of Birmingham in England.
 The first  was a 1910  light cruiser launched in 1913 and sold in 1931.
 The second  was a 1936  light cruiser launched in 1936 and broken up in 1960.
 The third  was a Type 42 destroyer in service from 1976 to 1999.
 The fourth  will be a Type 26 frigate.

Battle honours
 Heligoland 1914
 Dogger Bank 1915
 Jutland 1916
 Norway 1940
 Korea 1952–53

See also
 

Royal Navy ship names